The Revolt of Ahmet Anzavur was a series of revolts led by the Ottoman gendarme officer Ahmet Anzavur against the Turkish national movement during the Turkish War of Independence. The revolt was coordinated by the monarchist Ottoman government against the republican Turkish nationalist forces. The forces under Anzavur's command were made up of various ethnic groups with the bulk of the forces (including Anzavur). The "revolt" occurred October 1, 1919 to November 25, 1920 and occurred in the regions of Biga, Bandırma, Karacabey, and Kirmastı. Despite some difficulty, the revolts were decisively put down by the Çerkes Ethem forces.

Background 
The Revolt of Ahmet Anzavur was a series of revolts from October 1919 to November 1920. These revolts were by those loyal to the monarchy of the Ottoman Empire and opposed the nationalist revolutionary government. Each of these revolts were put down by nationalist commanders soon after they broke out.

First revolt and suppression 
The first uprising of Ahmet Anzavur occurred in Manyas in October 1919. Anzavur's declaration to the people of Manyas was that he intended to capture or kill Hacim Muhittin Çarıklı, the Nationalist commander in the region of Balıkesir. The forces he raised would be used to defend the power of the sultanate, located in Istanbul, from the growing threat of Nationalist forces, based in Ankara. Anzavur sent two telegrams the following day, one to the sultan and the other to Karesi Mustarrif Ali Riza, stating, "It is the duty of all true Muslims to defeat the Nationalists". The threat was well understood by the Nationalists in the country, who immediately began to make preparations to counter Ahmet Anzavur's movements.
Following up on his threats, Anzavur took a cohort of his followers to carry out attacks on the provisional Turkish government offices and troops, all the while bringing in more men into his ranks during November 1919. After avoiding talks with Nationalists about cessation of hostilities, Anzavur and his men were labeled common criminals and tools of the British and the palace.

The first actual battle of the rebellion occurred on November 15 north of Balıkesir. Anzavur's forces took heavy losses and were forced to retreat north through Susurluk, whilst being pursued by Köprülülü Hamdi. By the twentieth, fighting had broken out around Gönen, Manyas, Karacabey, Biga, and Susurluk. By the end of November, Anzavur's forces had to flee from Çerkes Ethem's forces. As winter approached, Anzavur disbanded his forces who melted into surrounding areas.

Ahmet Fevzi Paşa, also a Circassian, was sent to prevent Anzavur's influence in the region from growing. He attempted to recruit local Circassians for the nationalist Kuva-yi Milliye, but scholars believe that he was unsuccessful.

Second revolt and suppression 
After the harsh winter of 1920, Anzavur began recruiting for another campaign.  This army would be known as The Army of Muhammad.  Hostilities began again on February 16, 1920. As the vanguard of Anzavur's motley army entered Biga, shots rang out. Hamidi fled to a nearby weapons depot as the town fell to Anzavur, the men of the army and town embracing each other. His men refused to return to the town and shoot their fellow citizens.  He then ordered his second in command, Kani Bey, to return to town and execute Kara Hasan. Kani carried out the order and gunned down Hasan and 13 others in cold blood. Hasan's death angered the citizens of Biga. A mob of citizens attacked Kani Bey's home; he escaped initially with the help of a neighbor but was cut down by the mob's bullets shortly after his flight. Hamidi was cornered, trying to link up with other military officers in the area, by Pomaks and tied, beaten, and killed by having his neck snapped.
Anzavur's ranks began to swell as the victory in Biga was consolidated over the following month. A committee of three local notables and paramilitary leaders was organized to handle local issues. Shortly after a former regional inspector named Samih Rıfat Horozcu was sent to plead with locals to rejoin the nationalists, his pleas fell on deaf ears.

By the middle of March, a column of 500 nationalist troops was organized and sent to recapture Biga and the surrounding area. Anzavur led the defense against these troops.  Those who followed him, largely Circassians and Pomaks, were mostly armed with sticks and axes. After this defeat, Nationalist officers and soldiers began to desert their posts. Anzavur used this victory to recruit more fighters from the Gönen area. On April 4, troops led by Anzavur and Gavur Imam entered Gönen executing and pillaging with little resistance. By the 6th, Bandırma, Karacabey, and Kirmasti had fallen in rapid succession to The Army of Muhammad.
As Anzavur pushed Nationalist leaders in Southern Mamara, he knew the end was near. As the noose tightened, Çerkes Ethem was called upon to bring the rebellion to heel. Ethem was given 2,000 soldiers to do so. On April 16, Anzavur was dealt a resounding defeat near the village of Yahyaköy.  By April 19, Bandırma had fallen to Ethem, marking the gradual defeat of Anzavur and his forces. By the end of April, The Army of Muhammad had melted away, as at the end of the first rebellion, and Anzavur had returned to Istanbul on an English vessel.

Third revolt and death of Ahmet Anzavur 
With Anzavur's defeat at Yahyaköy, another revolt had broken out in the Adapazarı region. The leaders of this rebellion were (Berzeg) Safer, (Maan) Koc, and (Maan) Ali. The missteps of nationalist forces allowed the scenario to play out similarly to the events of South Marmara. The danger of the situation was recognized by the Nationalist government and ordered to be put down. Ethem was called upon to do so, fresh from putting down Anzavur's rebellion. His forces retook Adapazarı and Sapanca without a fight. On May 26, Ethem entered the town of Düzce and executed both (Berzeg) Safer, and (Maan) Koc; (Maan) Ali however managed to escape.

With the outbreak of a revolt in Düzce, the Ottoman government announced the creation of a new army, the Kuva-i Inzibatiye to put down the nationalist Kuva-yi Milliye. This army was to be composed of 1,000 unemployed soldiers under the command of Süleyman Şefik Pasha. It was announced on April 26 that Ahmet Anzavur would be given a command in the area. On May 4, Süleyman Şefik Pasha arrived in Izmit with Anzavur arriving four days later with 500 men he had recruited from Biga.

Anzavur's contributions to the fight were negligible, as he suffered a broken leg in a week of fighting with locals and nationalist forces. His forces continued to fight a while longer but were forced to retreat by the end of June. Anzavur faded into obscurity for about a year, until he began recruiting again. In May 1921, a group of pro-Nationalist paramilitary leaders found out about Anzavur's movements. The leader of the paramilitary groups was Arnavud Rahman. Rahman and his men ambushed and killed Ahmet Anzavur outside of Karabiga.

See also
 Revolts during the Turkish War of Independence

References

Conflicts in 1919
Conflicts in 1920
Turkish War of Independence
1919 in the Ottoman Empire
1920 in the Ottoman Empire
Anzavur